The Rockwell XFV-12 was a prototype supersonic United States Navy fighter which was built in 1977. The XFV-12 design attempted to combine the Mach 2 speed and AIM-7 Sparrow armament of the McDonnell Douglas F-4 Phantom II in a VTOL (vertical takeoff and landing) fighter for the small Sea Control Ship which was under study at the time. On paper, it looked superior to the subsonic Hawker Siddeley Harrier attack fighter. However it was unable to demonstrate an untethered vertical takeoff and its inability to meet performance requirements terminated the program.

Design and development

In 1972, the Navy issued a request for proposals for a next generation supersonic V/STOL fighter/attack aircraft. Rockwell's design with the XFV-12 won against Convair's proposal with the Convair Model 200. The XFV-12A, despite its concept being considered risky compared to that of the Harrier, was selected for development.

To reduce costs, the nose from a Douglas A-4 Skyhawk and intakes from the F-4 were used. Engine rig testing began in 1974. Free-flight model tests conducted at the NASA Langley full-scale wind tunnel showed the projected thrust augmentation levels were highly optimistic, and that the aircraft would most likely be incapable of vertical flight on the thrust available, while the design remained suitable for conventional flight.

The XFV-12 used a thrust augmented wing concept in which exhaust would be directed through spaces in a wing opened up like venetian blinds to increase available lift, somewhat like Lockheed's unsuccessful XV-4 Hummingbird. Such arrangement restricted weapons carriage to under the narrow fuselage and two conformal missile mounts. Its canards were extremely large, with almost 50% of the area of the wings, making it effectively a tandem wing. The 30,000 lbf (130 kN)-class afterburning turbofan engine had enough thrust to lift the weight of the 20,000 lb (9,072 kg) aircraft. It was modified to further increase thrust for vertical lift. The rear engine exhaust was closed and the gases redirected through ducts to ejector nozzles in the wings and canards for vertical lift.

Operational history
Ground testing of the XFV-12A began in July 1977, and the aircraft was officially rolled out at the Rockwell International facility in Columbus, Ohio on 26 August. Due to increasing costs, construction of the second prototype was abandoned.

Tethered hover tests were conducted in 1978. Over the course of six months, it was determined that the XFV-12A design suffered from major deficiencies with regard to vertical flight, especially a lack of sufficient vertical thrust. Lab tests showed 55% thrust augmentation should be expected; however, differences in the scaled-up system dropped augmentation levels to 19% for the wing and a mere 6% in the canard. While the augmenters did work as expected, the extensive ducting of the propulsion system degraded thrust, and in the end the power-to-weight ratio was such that the engine was capable of vertically lifting only 75% of the weight of the aircraft in which it was mounted.

Following the tests, and with the program suffering from cost overruns, the Navy decided the XFV-12A was not worth further development, and cancelled the project in 1981. The October 6, 1975 issue of Aviation Week published an article about the Rockwell NA-382 which was an even more ambitious proposal to the Marine Corps to fit a similar wing to the Lockheed C-130 Hercules, but the plan never made it off the drawing board.

Of the two prototypes built, only one was completed, while the second prototype was cancelled.

The United States Marine Corps eventually adopted the subsonic British-designed Harrier, the only truly successful V/STOL design of the 1960s. Its replacement, the Lockheed Martin F-35 Lightning II, uses a shaft-driven fan and a swivelling rear nozzle to achieve vertical landing. It is designed for supersonic and vertical flight with performance just over Mach 1.5 with weapons and range comparable to the older F-4 and F-18.

Surviving aircraft
Following program cancellation, the aircraft was disassembled and the cockpit section of the fuselage was stored at NASA's Plum Brook Station in Sandusky, Ohio. As of May 2012, a group of high school students at the EHOVE Career Center, with guidance from NASA contractor personnel, were to restore the fuselage for use as a museum display.

Specifications

See also

References
Notes

Bibliography
Buttler, Tony. American Secret Projects, Fighters & Interceptors 1945-1978. Hinckley, UK: Midland Publishing. 2007. .

External links

Line illustration of the Rockwell XFV-12
Illustration of XFV-12 engine airflow

Cancelled military aircraft projects of the United States
Canard aircraft
Carrier-based aircraft
FV-12
Rockwell FV-12
V/STOL aircraft by thrust vectoring
Single-engined jet aircraft